Fukkashi is Maldivian anthology television series written by Kopee Mohamed Rasheed and directed by Hussain Rasheed. The series consists of twenty-five episodes, spanning through different genres, mainly serious comedy, and presents different story and different set of characters in each episode.

Hussain Shibau was cast in a total of nineteen episodes followed by Mohamed Anil (16 episodes), Aminath Shareef (15 episodes), Fathimath Niuma (14 episodes) and Chilhiya Moosa Manik (13 episodes). Except for the character Hassan, portrayed by Hussain Shibau in the episodes "Tharutheebu" and "Dhari Kulunu", all the characters are distinct and has no connection or reference to a preceding episode, even though same actors recur in multiple episodes. The first fifteen episodes were released in 2005 while the rest ten episodes were released in 2006.

Episodes

Soundtrack

Reception
Upon release, the series received mainly positive reviews from audience and critics, where its humor and comic elements were particularly praised.

References

Serial drama television series
Maldivian television shows